Lifetime achievement awards are awarded by various organizations, to recognize contributions over the whole of a career, rather than or in addition to single contributions.

Such awards, and organizations presenting them, include:

A 
 A.C. Redfield Lifetime Achievement Award
 Academy Honorary Award
 Acharius Medal
 ACUM prize
 AFI Life Achievement Award
 Áillohaš Music Award
 American Society of Landscape Architects Medal
 Anisfield-Wolf Book Awards
 ANR National Award
 Asianet Film Awards

B 
 BBC Jazz Awards
 BBC Sports Personality of the Year Lifetime Achievement Award
 BET Lifetime Achievement Award
 BBC Radio 2 Folk Awards
 BBC Sports Personality of the Year
 BET Awards
 Billboard Latin Music Lifetime Achievement Award
 Bram Stoker Award for Lifetime Achievement
 Brit Award for Outstanding Contribution to Music
 British Academy Television Awards
 British Comedy Awards
 Buck O'Neil Lifetime Achievement Award
 BCAHRB Lifetime Achievement Award

C 
 Canadian Music Hall of Fame
 Carol Burnett Award for Achievement in Television
 Çavaria Lifetime Achievement Award
 Chicago International Film Festival
 Christopher Brennan Award
 Council of Fashion Designers of America
 Covenant Awards
 CTBUH Skyscraper Award
 Premio Cuervo Tradicional

D 
 Dadasaheb Phalke Award
 Daytime Emmy Award
 Dawn Breakers International Film Festival
 Denham Harman Research Award
 Detektor Master 456 squids
 Dhyan Chand Award for Lifetime Achievement in Sports and Games
 Disney Legend Award
 Donostia Award
 Down Beat Lifetime Achievement Award
 Dr. Rajkumar Award

E 
 Earle Grey Award
 Emmy Award
 Enrico Fermi Award

F 
 Filipino Academy of Movie Arts and Sciences Award
 Filmfare Lifetime Achievement Award
 Filmfare Lifetime Achievement Award (South)
 Folksbiene National Yiddish Theatre

G 
 GMA Canada
 GMA Canada Lifetime Achievement Award
 Gawad Urian Awards
 Game Developers Choice Awards
General Administration of Sport of China | All-China Youth Federation 
 Gershwin Prize
 Golden Globe Cecil B. DeMille Award
 Golden Pen Lifetime Achievement Award
 Governor General's Awards
 Grammy Lifetime Achievement Award
 Gumshoe Awards

H 

 Hong Kong Film Award for Lifetime Achievement
 Hayek Lifetime Achievement Award

I 
 IIFA Lifetime Achievement Award
 Indspire Awards
 International Sculpture Center
 International Clarinet Association Honorary Membership
 International League Against Epilepsy
 International Primatological Society IPS Lifetime Achievement Award 
 Internet Hall of Fame

J 

 J. C. Daniel Award
 Jim Thorpe Lifetime Achievement Award
 John Bunn Award
 John Muir Lifetime Achievement Award
 JA Lifetime Achievement Award

K 
 Kennedy Center Honors
 Kerala State Film Award for Lifetime Achievement
 Kluge Prize

L 
 Lannan Literary Awards
 Latin Grammy Lifetime Achievement Award
 Lemelson–MIT Prize
 Lifetime Achievement Emmy
 Leroy P. Steele Prize
 Lo Nuestro Excellence Award
 List of Israel Prize recipients
 List of Grammy Award categories
 List of National Hockey League awards
 Longford Lyell Award
 Lux Style Award

M 
 MAC Awards
 Margaret Collier Award
 Martial Arts Industry Association (MAIA) — Australia 
 MTV Movie Awards
 MTV Video Vanguard Award
 St. Mother Theresa University for Digital Education Excellence and Sustainability Development and World Peace

N 
 NTR National Award
 NAACP Theatre Award – Lifetime Achievement Award
 National Air and Space Museum Trophy
 National Television Awards
 NBA Lifetime Achievement Award
 Nigar Awards
 Nuclear-Free Future Award

O 
 Oscar Hammerstein Award

P 
 Paul "Bear" Bryant Award
 PEN/ESPN Lifetime Achievement Award for Literary Sports Writing
 Pennsylvania NewsMedia Association#Awards
 PGA Tour Lifetime Achievement Award
 Photographic Society of America
 Pilgrim Award
 Positive Coaching Alliance
 Pride of Britain Awards
 PWI Stanley Weston Award

R 
 Raghupathi Venkaiah Award
 Retail Council of Canada

S 
 SEAMUS Lifetime Achievement Award
 Sidney Kobre Award for Lifetime Achievement in Journalism History
 Slobodan Piva Ivković Award for Lifetime Achievement
 Society for Developmental Biology (SDB)
 Special Tony Award
 Sports Lifetime Achievement Award
 Star Awards for Special Achievement Award
 Star Screen Lifetime Achievement Award
 Stardust Award for Lifetime Achievement

T 
 Themed Entertainment Association
 Truman Capote Award for Literary Criticism

U 
 USENIX

W 
 Willie Nelson Lifetime Achievement Award
 World Fantasy Award for Life Achievement
 World Soundtrack Award – Lifetime Achievement

Y 
 Young Artist Former Child Star Lifetime Achievement Award

Z 
 Zee Cine Award for Lifetime Achievement
 Zlatni pečat Jugoslovenske kinoteke

References

 
lifetime achievement awards